Mätäsvaara is a small village in Finland in the town of Lieksa, North Karelia. It is located on the east side of the lake Pielinen and between the town of Nurmes 27 kilometres from the centre of Lieksa.

Villages in Finland
Lieksa